Jewel is Beni's sixth studio album, and third original album under the mononym Beni released through Nayutawave Records. It was released on December 8, 2010.

Background
The album was released only six months after her second album Lovebox. Lovebox managed to get the #1 weekly spot on the Oricon charts. This album however charted at the #11 spot on the Oricon Charts Weekly.

Promotion
The song 2FACE was the ending theme for NTVs program HAPPY Music (ハッピーMUSIC).
The song Heaven's Door was the opening theme for the national TV program CDTV.
And the song Smile is the theme song for the commercial Home Mate (ホームメイト; Homu Meito).

Track listing

Charts

References

2010 albums
Beni (singer) albums
Japanese-language albums